Christopher Jenkins (born November 1961)  is a Welsh effects animator, storyboard artist, screenwriter, director and producer.

Early life
Jenkins was born and raised in Ton Pentre, Rhondda Valley in South Wales. He attended the Ton Pentre Junior School and later went to the Upper Rhondda Comprehensive School. He attended Middlesex University in England from 1982 to 1987, where he has a BA Degree in scientific illustration.

Career
Jenkins started his career in 1987 as an effects animator on Who Framed Roger Rabbit. He spent most of his professional life at Walt Disney Pictures where he served as artistic coordinator on Atlantis: The Lost Empire. Before that, Jenkins was visual effects supervisor on The Hunchback of Notre Dame. He also was an effects animator on Who Framed Roger Rabbit, The Little Mermaid, Beauty and the Beast, Aladdin, The Lion King, and Hercules.

Jenkins left Disney to work at Sony Pictures Imageworks, where he conceived the idea for Surf's Up. Jenkins had been attached to direct Hotel Transylvania before leaving the company.

He worked at Blue Sky Studios in Greenwich, Connecticut, for one year during the development of Rio.

As of August 2011, Jenkins is at DreamWorks Animation, where he produced the 2015 animated feature film Home.

Filmography

References 

 "Q&A with Producer Chris Jenkins", Bill Desowitz, Surf's Up official site, 2007. Archive
 "Chris Jenkins, Ash Brannon, and Chris Buck Are Creating Waves in Their New Film Surf's Up", 6 June 2007, MovieWeb.com.
 "A wave of anticipation", 21 February 2008, by Kathryn Williams, Rhondda Leader.

External links
 

Welsh film producers
Welsh animators
British storyboard artists
British animated film producers
Special effects people
Visual effects supervisors
Alumni of Middlesex University
Year of birth uncertain
1960s births
Living people
Sony Pictures Animation people